Cnemaspis vandeventeri, also known as the VanDeventer's rock gecko, is a species of gecko endemic to central Thailand.

References

vandeventeri
Reptiles described in 2010
Taxa named by Kirati Kunya